Whitehill Lodge is a Category C listed building on Damhead Way in Peterhead, Aberdeenshire, Scotland. It is known to have been standing since at least the early 1870s, possibly earlier. Its prominent features are a log-column porch and decorative bargeboards.

A Gothic-style cottage named Dales, also on Damhead Way, dates to around 1800.

See also
List of listed buildings in Peterhead, Aberdeenshire

References

External links
 Whitehill Lodge – Google Street View, 2015

Category C listed buildings in Aberdeenshire
Listed buildings in Peterhead
Hunting lodges in Scotland
Victorian architecture in the United Kingdom